All American Racers is an American-licensed auto racing team and constructor based in Santa Ana, California. Founded by Dan Gurney and Carroll Shelby in 1964, All American Racers initially participated in American sports car and Champ Car races as well as international Formula One events with cars named Eagle.  The Formula One team, based in the United Kingdom and using British-built Weslake engines was named Anglo American Racers.  Under team manager Bill Dunne they set up shop in Rye, East Sussex. The team were adjacent to Harry Weslake's engine development plant and half a mile from Elva cars. They participated in 25 Grands Prix, entering a total of 34 cars.

The first Eagles were created after AAR entered a Goodyear-backed Lotus 38 in the 1965 Indianapolis 500 and Gurney hired former Lotus designer Len Terry to develop their own car for 1966.  The resulting Ford-powered Eagle T2G was codeveloped with the Eagle T1G for Formula 1.  After exiting Formula One in 1968 and concentrating on Champ Car, Eagle turned to sports car racing in the 1980s, partnering with Toyota to develop the Celica and later sports prototypes for the IMSA GT Championship.

The company built the Ben Bowlby-designed DeltaWing that was run by Highcroft Racing at the 2012 24 Hours of Le Mans.

Formula 1

In order to run the Formula 1 operations, Gurney established the Anglo American Racers team, based in Rye, East Sussex, UK, though the cars were built in Santa Ana, California, USA by the All American Racers team. The Eagle T1G car, powered by an obsolete Coventry Climax engine, debuted at the 1966 Belgian Grand Prix and scored its first points with a fifth place three weeks later at the French Grand Prix. For the  season Richie Ginther was signed as a second driver. The Climax engine was replaced by a new 3-liter Weslake V12 designed by Aubrey Woods and built in Great Britain by Harry Weslake. At the 1967 Belgian Grand Prix Gurney achieved a victory, the first "all-American" victory in a Grand Prix since Jimmy Murphy´s triumph with Duesenberg at the 1921 French Grand Prix. Excluding the Indianapolis 500, this is the only win for a USA-built car as well as one of only two wins of an American-licensed constructor in Formula One.

The Eagle-Weslake was a beautiful and efficient car, one example of which was constructed in titanium and exotic alloys. More than this, the Eagle was designed to make the tall Gurney fit comfortably at the wheel. Their efforts produced a V12 that was smooth and powerful. At Monza, an insight into the future of engine design was seen for the first time. The engine had four valves per cylinder at a narrow included angle (thirty degrees) that allowed a single cover to enclose both the close-spaced camshafts on each bank. The sixty-degree-vee layout had a larger bore than stroke (72.8 X 60mm).  Gurney's program ran out of money in 1968 and by the end of the year he returned to the United States to concentrate his efforts on the more successful Indycar program, in which Bobby Unser had won the Indianapolis 500 and the 1968 Indycar Championship. A non-works version briefly appeared with privateer Al Pease in the 1969 Canadian Grand Prix, but Pease became noticed for all the wrong reasons and made history as the only F1 driver ever disqualified for being too slow.

USAC & CART Champ Car

During the USAC years, the Eagle chassis was very successful in the late 1960s and 1970s. Eagles won 51 Champ Car races, including the 1968 and 1975 Indy 500's won by Bobby Unser and the 1973 race won by Gordon Johncock. During this two-decade period, Bobby Unser, who drove Eagle cars for most of his teams, joined AAR as the sole driver, winning the 1975 Indianapolis 500. Unser also claimed 22 wins and 52 podiums with Eagle cars. After Unser's departure from the team for Team Penske, All American Racers started to lose their edge in IndyCar competition. Mike Mosley won a few races for the team before being dismissed at the end of 1982. By 1984, AAR merged with Mike Curb's team to form Curb-All American Racers. After a two-year partnership with Curb, Gurney and Curb parted ways, and this marked the beginning of the end of AAR's time in IndyCar.

The All American Racers team was inactive in single-seaters from 1987 to 1995 and returned in 1996 again building their own chassis and using new Toyota engines. However, this new effort, a combination of new and untested equipment, did not prove to be successful, never winning a race and collecting only occasional top-tens. The team ceased active racing after the 1999 CART season.

CART/USAC drivers
 Alex Barron (1998–1999)
 Raul Boesel (1999)
 Geoff Brabham (1981)
 Mike Chandler (1982, 1984)
 Kevin Cogan (1984–1985)
 Juan Manuel Fangio II (1996–1997)
 Pete Halsmer (1984)
 P. J. Jones (1996–1998)
 Jan Lammers (1986)
 Bobby Unser (1972–1978, USAC)
 Andrea Montermini (1999)
 Rocky Moran (1981)
 Mike Mosley (1979–1981)
 Ed Pimm (1984–1985)
 Gualter Salles (1999)
 Tom Sneva (1985)
 Vincenzo Sospiri (1998)

IMSA GT 
Gurney's team was contracted by Toyota in 1983 to enter the IMSA GT Championship with specially-modified Toyota Celicas.

In 1988, the team moved up to the GTP category with two chassis – a modified Toyota 88C Group C car and a team-designed Eagle HF89 purpose-built for IMSA competition.

AAR experienced its greatest success in GTP competition with the Eagle MkIII, introduced in 1991. Powered by a turbocharged 2.1-liter Toyota inline-4 developing up to 800 horsepower and generating 10,000 pounds of downforce at 200 mph, the MkIII won 21 of the 27 races in which it was entered – a record so dominant that it has been blamed for the collapse of the GTP series.

Trans-Am
AAR created a special Trans-Am Series version of the Plymouth Barracuda, running in the 1970 season with drivers Dan Gurney and Swede Savage.  A homologation special production edition was offered in 1970.

Racing results

Complete Formula One World Championship results

Anglo American Racers
(key)

Non-works entries
(key)

Complete Formula One Non-Championship results
(key)

Complete CART PPG Indy Car World Series results
(key) (results in bold indicate pole position)

Notes

References

External links
 Official Website

 
Formula One entrants
Champ Car teams
Sports car racing teams
1964 establishments in California
1999 disestablishments in California
American auto racing teams
American racecar constructors
Companies based in Santa Ana, California
Auto racing teams established in 1964
Auto racing teams disestablished in 1999
Atlantic Championship teams